Neopsylla is a genus of fleas belonging to the family Hystrichopsyllidae.

The species of this genus are found in Europe and Southeastern Asia.

Species:

Neopsylla abagaitui 
Neopsylla acanthina 
Neopsylla affinis 
Neopsylla aliena 
Neopsylla angustimanubra

References

Hystrichopsyllidae